Lawrence, Prince of Mecca is a 1927 biographical book about T. E. Lawrence by E. V. Timms writing under the name "David Roseler".

References

External links
Lawrence, Prince of Mecca at AustLit

Australian biographies
1927 non-fiction books
T. E. Lawrence